Giritee Loabi is a Maldivian romantic comedy drama web series written by Ahmed Zareer and directed by Ali Shifau. It stars Mohamed Manik, Aminath Rashfa, Mohamed Vishal and Adam Rizwee in main roles. The pilot episode of the series was released on 7 December 2021.

Cast and characters

Main
 Mohamed Manik as Sattaru
 Aminath Rashfa as Noora
 Mohamed Vishal as Faizan
 Adam Rizwee as Ashraf

Recurring
 Ahmed Saeed as Faiz
 Hamdhoon Farooq as Lamman
 Aisha Ali as Fathun 
 Ummu as Hajja
 Mohamed Faisal as Umaru
 Ahmed Sharif as Sharaf
 Mariyam Majudha as Naaz
 Ahmed Shakir as Shaazly
 Mohamed Shivaz as Ilyas
 Hamdhan Farooq as Mahdy; Naaz's boss
 Mohamed Afrah as Sattaru's boss
 Ali Shazleem as Rasheed

Guest
 Ali Nadheeh as Irushad; Faizan's friend (Episode 10)
 Ali Shameel as Faheem; Faizan's landlord (Episode 14)
 Aminath Shaana as a customer (Episode 15)
 Ahmed Easa as a doctor (Episode 15)
 Ibrahim Shiyaz as Ibrahim (Episode 18)
 Sheela Najeeb as Shaira (Episode 22)
 Mariyam Haleem as Zubeydha (Episode 22)
 Mohamed Rifshan as Masoodh (Episode 22)
 Fensir Ibbe
 Aminath Sham
 Niusha
 Azmee Adam Naseer

Episodes

Development
The project was officially announced on 11 July 2021 on Dark Rain Entertainment's Facebook page. Filming for the series commenced in August 2021 with the actors, Mohamed Vishal, Aminath Rashfa, Mohamed Manik, Mohamed Faisal and Adam Rizwee. Filming was completed in October 2021.

Soundtrack

Release and reception
On 22 September 2021, Dark Rain Entertainment announced that the series will be premiered digitally on Baiskoafu at the end of year. The first episode of the series was initially slated to release on 20 November 2021, which was later pushed to premiere on 7 December 2021.

References

Serial drama television series
Maldivian television shows
Maldivian web series